Space Chase may refer to:
 Space Chase USA, a 2019 American PBS television film documentary about the Apollo space program and its effects on a small Florida town.
 "Space Chase", a song by Hawkwind from their 1980 album Levitation
 Spacechase, an Atari 2600 video game
 Space Chase (album), an album by German acid jazz group, Tab Two
 Space Chase, the 2005 British short film from Catsnake Studios featuring elements of Parkour and featured in Parkour Journeys (2006)
 Space Chase, the pre-production name for television show Farscape